The 2002 Bethune–Cookman Wildcats football team was an American football team that represented Bethune-Cookman University as a member of the Mid-Eastern Athletic Conference (MEAC) during the 2002 NCAA Division I-AA football season. In its fifth season under head coach Alvin Wyatt, the team compiled an 11–2 record (7–1 against MEAC opponents) and won the MEAC championship. The team played its home games at Municipal Stadium in Daytona Beach, Florida.

With an 11–1 record in the regular season, the team advanced to post-season play, losing to Georgia Southern
in the Division I-AA 1st Round Playoff Game.

Bethune-Cookman was led on offense by junior quarterback Allen Suber.  Suber missed the team's November 9 game against , leading to the team's only loss in the regular season.

Schedule

Roster

References

Bethune-Cookman
Bethune–Cookman Wildcats football seasons
Mid-Eastern Athletic Conference football champion seasons
Bethune-Cookman Wildcats football